The Institute for Monitoring Peace and Cultural Tolerance in School Education (IMPACT-SE), formerly known as the Center for Monitoring the Impact of Peace (CMIP), is an Israeli non-profit organization that monitors the content of school textbooks, specifically how they educate in relation to religion, societies, cultures, democratic values and the 'Other'. It examines school curricula worldwide, to determine whether the material conforms to international standards as derived from UNESCO declarations and resolutions, advocating for change when necessary. The organization believes that education should be utilized to encourage tolerance, pluralism and democracy, and promote peaceful means of solving conflicts.

Scope and impact 

The organization analyzes textbooks, teachers' guides and curricula from across the world. Examples include in-depth reports on Egypt, Turkey, United States, Israel, Palestinian Authority, Iran and Canada. These reports have examined a range of issues including attitudes towards peace, tolerance, democracy and minorities.

The impact of these reports has included the European Parliament's decision to freeze elements of Palestinian Authority funding until curricula are brought into line with international standards. The same report by the organization led to questions being raised publicly over similar funding from governments in Switzerland, Germany and UK. In Israel, the organization's reporting generated media analysis of failures in the publicly funded ultra-Orthodox Jewish educational system. The organization was also invited to help create a curriculum for Syrian children seeking refuge in Greece.

Methodology
The organization applies methodological standards to its reporting, which are based on UNESCO and UN declarations and resolutions. This is a condensed version of the standards for peace and tolerance in school education:

 RESPECT: The curriculum should promote tolerance, understanding and respect toward the "Other," his or her culture, achievements, values and way of life.
 INDIVIDUAL OTHER: The curriculum should foster personal attachment toward the Other as an individual, his or her desire to be familiar, loved and appreciated.     
 NO HATE: The curriculum should be free of wording, imagery and ideologies likely to create prejudices, misconceptions, stereotypes,     misunderstandings, mistrust, racial hatred, religious bigotry and national hatred, as well as any other form of hatred or contempt for other groups or peoples. 
 PEACEMAKING: The curriculum should develop capabilities for non-violent conflict resolution and promote peace. 
 UNBIASED INFORMATION: Educational materials (textbooks, workbooks, teachers’ guides, maps, illustrations, aids) should be up-to-date, accurate, complete, balanced and unprejudiced, and use equal standards to promote mutual knowledge and understanding between different peoples. 
 GENDER:The curriculum should foster equality and mutual respect between women and men. It should refrain from stereotyped gender roles. 
 SOUND PROSPERITY and COOPERATION: The curriculum should educate for sound and sustainable economic conduct and preservation of the environment for future generations. It should encourage regional and local cooperation to that effect

Publications
Publications by the Institute for Monitoring Peace and Cultural Tolerance in School Education include:
 Palestinian textbooks: The New Palestinian Curriculum: 2018-19 Update – Grades 1-12 (Published September 2018)
 Syrian textbooks: Syrian National Identity: Reformulating School Textbook During the Civil War (published July 2018)
 Turkish textbooks: Turkey’s Curriculum Under Erdogan: The Evolution of Turkish Identity (published November 2016)
 Iranian textbooks: Iranian Education: The Continuous Revolution (published 2016)
 US and Canadian textbooks: Between Sharia and Democracy: Islamic Education in North America (published March 2016)
 Egyptian textbooks: Inculcating Islamist Ideals in Egypt (published Fall 2015)
 Israeli textbooks: Peace,Tolerance and the Palestinian “Other” in Israeli Textbooks (published 2009–2012)
 Egyptian textbooks: Jews, Christians, War and Peace in Egyptian School Textbooks (published March 2004) 
 Iranian textbooks: The Attitude to the "Other" and to Peace in Iranian School Textbooks and Teachers' Guides (published October 2006) 
 Israeli textbooks: Arabs, Palestinians, Islam and Peace in Israeli School Textbooks (published 2000–2001, updated 2001–2002 from Arabs and Palestinians in Israeli Textbooks)
 Palestinian textbooks: Palestinian Textbooks: From Arafat to Abbas and Hamas (published March 2008)
 Saudi Arabian textbooks: The West, Christians and Jews in Saudi Arabian Schoolbooks (published January 2003)

Media 
Reports in the media which include the work of the Institute for Monitoring Peace and Cultural Tolerance in School Education include: 
 Der Bund (Switzerland), UNO-Shulbucher verherrlichen Terroristen (January 2019)
 Jerusalem Post (Israel), "European Parliament Committee Votes to Freeze €15m to PA Over Inciting Textbooks" (September 2018)
 Sunday Times (UK), Britain gives £20m for schools glorifying martyrs and jihad (April 2018)
 La Libre (Belgium), "Quand des manuels scolaires palestiniens promeuvent le martyre: la Belgique impliquée" (November 2017) 
 Newsweek, "Why are Palestinian kids being taught to hate?" (March 2017) 
 Hurriyet (Turkey), "Another dangerous ideological touch to education" (January 2017)

See also
 Palestinian Media Watch
 Education in Israel
 Education in the Palestinian National Authority
 Education in Egypt

References

External links
 Official Website
 Culture of Hate Persists in Saudi Arabia and Egypt

Mass media in the State of Palestine
Educational research
Textbooks in the Middle East
Textbook controversies
Organizations established in 1998
Organizations based in Jerusalem
Non-governmental organizations involved in the Israeli–Palestinian conflict